Quartet is a 2012 British comedy-drama film based on the play Quartet by Ronald Harwood, which ran in London's West End from September 1999 until January 2000. It was filmed late in 2011 at Hedsor House, Buckinghamshire. The film is actor Dustin Hoffman's directorial debut.

Plot
The plot takes place in Beecham House, a retirement home for former professional musicians, patterned after the real-life Casa di Riposo per Musicisti founded by Giuseppe Verdi. Reg, Wilf and Cissy are retired opera singers who often worked together in the past; among other residents are Cedric Livingstone, a former director, and diva Anne Langley. All the guests in the retirement home are suffering in varying degree the ailments old age can bring but continue to be engaged in their former professions in one way or another, including lecturing and introducing young people to music.

Finances threaten closure of the home, but proceeds from a yearly gala concert on Verdi's birthday hold hope for a continuation of the place. However, Cedric has become rather desperate because some of the most prominent singers have either died or decided not to participate at all. Reg, Wilf and Cissy were in the cast of a very highly rated recording of the opera Rigoletto, which includes a famous quartet for soprano, mezzo-soprano, tenor and baritone ("Bella figlia dell'amore"). This version is very prominent among opera buffs as THE Rigoletto of the post-war era.

Reg is shocked to find his former wife Jean Horton, the missing soprano of the Rigoletto recording, turning up to live at Beecham House. Reg is angry not to have been warned or consulted as their parting was on very sour terms. At first, Jean tries unsuccessfully to mend things with Reg. In the ensuing conversations her infidelity arises, as well as her past marriages, but Reg comes to understand that all that is now in the past. In the meantime, Cedric has come up with a plan that could work, but has one flaw. He meets with Wilf, Cissy and Reg to put his idea to them. His hope is to convince them to re-form the quartet who sang on the famous recording and to sing it again for the Verdi Gala concert, hoping it will sell enough tickets to save the home. Reg is sceptical but agrees, having overcome his issues and problems with Jean living at the home and being in such close proximity daily. Wilf persuades the doctor in charge to allow them a night out, resulting in Reg, Wilf and Cissy inviting Jean to dinner. Blissfully unaware and thinking friendships mended and repaired, with the past forgotten, Jean accepts the invitation; however, she is harder to persuade as she vowed never to sing again after retiring, resulting in her getting angry and storming out of the restaurant.

The following morning, Cissy brings Jean flowers from the garden to cheer her up, and asks if she wishes to discuss the quartet, but Jean doesn't want to take the flowers and beats Cissy with them, which only aggravates Cissy's already delicate senile condition. Jean apologises and is finally persuaded to sing in the quartet from Rigoletto, after learning that Anne Langley will be singing "Vissi d'arte" from Tosca as a finale, unless the four of them sing together, in which case they will be given pride of place as the last to perform. The group prepare for their performance and, moments before their curtain call, Cissy gets very confused and attempts to walk out the door, saying that she has to go back to her family, but Jean manages to salvage the situation. During her conversation with Cissy, Jean expresses regret for all her past bad behaviour towards Reg and admits that she is still in love with him. Reg overhears this.

Just as the recital is about to start, the director of the home is amazed at the energy displayed by the guests of the home. The idea of rehearsing and playing before an audience has brought life back to the home and the quartet. Prior to going on stage, Reg asks Jean to marry him again. As the quartet enter the stage individually, and to the rapturous applause of the audience, Reg stands next to Jean. Jean asks Reg if he was serious, he replies yes. Jean accepts and takes Reg by the hand.

Cast

Many of the supporting and background cast in the film's "retirement home for former professional musicians" were portrayed by actual professional musicians, as illustrated by then-and-now photos during the closing credits:

Production
Headline Pictures' Mark Shivas and Stewart Mackinnon acquired the film rights to the play from Ronald Harwood, and, with funding from BBC Films, commissioned him to write the screenplay. Mackinnon then approached a number of co-producers and directors, and eventually contracted the producer Finola Dwyer and director Dustin Hoffman. Mark Shivas died four years before the film was completed.

Quartet is set at Beecham House, a retirement home for musicians. Hedsor House in Buckinghamshire was used as the location of Beecham House. Several scenes were filmed at St Nicholas' Church, Hedsor.

Dustin Hoffman said Harwood was inspired by the 1984 documentary Tosca's Kiss (about the world's first nursing home for retired opera singers, founded in Milan by composer Giuseppe Verdi in 1896) to write the original play on which the film is based.

Release

Quartet premiered at the 2012 Toronto International Film Festival on 9 September 2012, followed by screenings at another dozen film festivals during the autumn of 2012. The film had its first general release in Australia and New Zealand on 26 December 2012, before being released in the United Kingdom on 1 January 2013 and in Ireland three days later. It saw a limited release in the United States on 11 January 2013.

Quartet was also screened at Cardiff's Cineworld complex on Thursday, 6 December 2012, in a charity event arranged by the Rotary Club of Blackwood, with proceeds donated to charities. The premiere was attended by the film's producer Finola Dwyer, who gave an interview on the making of the film.

Quartet was released on DVD and Blu-ray/DVD/digital on 6 May 2013 in the UK, and on 18 June 2013 in the United States.

Reception
Quartet received generally positive reviews from professional film critics. The review aggregator website Rotten Tomatoes reported a 79% approval rating with an average rating of 6.5/10 based on 135 reviews. The website's consensus reads, "It's sweet, gentle, and predictable to a fault, but Dustin Hoffman's affectionate direction and the talented cast's amiable charm make Quartet too difficult to resist." Metacritic gave a score of 64 out of 100 based on 36 reviews, indicating "generally favorable reviews".

Lisa Schwarzbaum of Entertainment Weekly gave the movie a B, writing,This lulling inspirational fantasy/comedy in the key of The Best Exotic Marigold Hotel offers aging, cultured Englishfolk (and one randy Scot, played by Billy Connolly) living out their golden years in a beautifully maintained residence for retired musicians. Every vista suggests that this gracious oldies' home is situated down the road from Downton Abbey, and every scene insists that real physical or mental infirmity belongs in some other picture.

References

External links

 
 
 
 

2012 films
2012 comedy-drama films
2012 independent films
British comedy-drama films
British independent films
2010s English-language films
Films scored by Dario Marianelli
Films about music and musicians
Films about infidelity
Films about old age
British films based on plays
Films directed by Dustin Hoffman
Films set in country houses
Films set in England
Films shot in Buckinghamshire
BBC Film films
Films with screenplays by Ronald Harwood
2012 directorial debut films
2010s British films